John Noel may refer to:
John Noel (1659–1718), Member of Parliament for Rutland
John Noel (1702–1728), Member of Parliament for Rutland
Jack Noel (1856–1936), Australian cricketer
John Baptist Lucius Noel (1890–1989), British mountaineer
John Noel (sport shooter) (1888–1939), American sport shooter
John Noel (producer) (born 1952), British television producer and theatrical agent
John Fraser Noel (1942–1966), British engineer in Antarctica
John M. Noel, American businessman
John Noel, Oil and Gas Campaigns Coordinator for Clean Water Action

See also
John William Noell (1816–1863), U.S. politician